Krystle N. Matthews (born February 27, 1981) is an American politician and engineering planner. She is a former member of the South Carolina House of Representatives from the 117th district, serving from 2018 to 2022. She is a member of the Democratic Party.

On April 12, 2021, Matthews announced her candidacy in the 2022 election for South Carolina's Class 3 seat in the United States Senate. She won the Democratic primary in a June 28 runoff, and lost to incumbent Republican senator Tim Scott in the general election. In the general election, Matthews was running in two races simultaneously. She lost her South Carolina House of Representatives seat to Republican Jordan Pace.

Political career 
Matthews was elected to the South Carolina House of Representatives in 2018, defeating incumbent Republican Bill Crosby. This made her the first black woman to represent this district.

Matthews was a member of the Medical, Military, Public, and Municipal Affairs committee, and of the Operations and Management committee.

June 2022 phone recording 
On June 26, 2022, audio of a prison phone call was released by the far-right activist group Project Veritas. On the recording, Matthews expresses a desire to accept money from drug dealers to fund her campaign and also calls for Democrats to run as "secret sleepers" in Republican primaries. She also instructed the inmate to use the name of somebody in their family rather than their own name, without the knowledge of the family member, when making the donation.
Matthews won the primary runoff two days later. In reference to the recording, Matthews said, “Nothing I said was untrue. And everything I said are also things that I’ve already talked about throughout my campaign. I don’t run from anything.” She described the phone call with the inmate as "tongue-in-cheek" and argued that she was not advocating for any illegal activities. She apologized for her language in a private conversation.

September 2022 recording 
On September 8, 2022, Project Veritas again obtained a recording of Matthews making statements about white people, resulting in calls for her resignation by Republican South Carolina Attorney General Alan Wilson and fellow Democrat South Carolina State House Representative Justin Bamberg. In the recording, Representative Matthews states, "My district is slightly Republican, and it's heavily white. I'm no stranger to white people, I'm from a mostly white town. And let me tell you one thing. You oughta know who you're dealing with, like -- you gotta treat them like shit, like I mean that’s the only way they’ll respect you. I keep them right here, like under my thumbs. That's where I keep it. You have to, otherwise they get out of control, like kids." In a statement, Matthews confirmed that her voice is heard in the recording and characterized the incident as an attack, referring to Project Veritas as a "satirical MAGA Powered news outlet".

Personal life
Matthews was born in Sandusky, Ohio and graduated from Sandusky High School in 1999. She currently resides in Ladson, South Carolina and has five children. She worked as an engineering planner until 2021.

Electoral history

South Carolina House of Representatives
2018
Matthews was the only Democrat in her district to run in 2018, so there was no Democratic primary.

2020

United States Senate

References

External links
Representative Krystle N. Matthews legislative website 
Krystle Matthews for Senate

|-

21st-century African-American politicians
21st-century American politicians
African-American people in South Carolina politics
Bowling Green State University alumni
Candidates in the 2022 United States Senate elections
Living people
Democratic Party members of the South Carolina House of Representatives
1981 births